Lick Mill station is a light rail station operated by Santa Clara Valley Transportation Authority (VTA).  Lick Mill is served by the Orange and Green light rail lines.

Lick Mill is VTA's recommended transfer point for Altamont Corridor Express (ACE) commuter rail and Capitol Corridor inter-city rail trains at Santa Clara – Great America station. The path between VTA station and the ACE/Capitol Corridor station is well signed but is not wheelchair accessible because of a staircase.

Lick Mill is closed for up to 60 minutes after the events at the nearby Levi's Stadium to prevent crowds from overwhelming the station. VTA's Great America station (which is located closer to the stadium) has additional facilities to handle large crowds.

Location
The station is located in the median of Tasman Drive just east of Calle Del Sol. The northbound platform is located closer to Lick Mill Road while the southbound platform is located closer to Calle Del Sol.

Station layout

References

External links

Santa Clara Valley Transportation Authority light rail stations
Santa Clara Valley Transportation Authority bus stations
Railway stations in San Jose, California
Railway stations in the United States opened in 1987
1987 establishments in California